The 1922–23 season was the 25th in the history of the Southern League. The league was split into two sections for a third season in a row, one for English clubs and one for Welsh clubs. Bristol City reserves won the English section, whilst Ebbw Vale won the Welsh section. Ebbw Vale were declared Southern League champions after beating Bristol City reserves 2–1 in a championship play-off. Boscombe,  Pontypridd and Torquay United were the only Southern League clubs to apply for election to the Football League, with Boscombe being successful. The club was renamed Bournemouth & Boscombe Athletic the following year.

Following to the mid-season resignation of four clubs in the Welsh section due to financial problems and Porth Athletic leaving the league at the end of the season, the following season saw the English section renamed the Eastern Division and the Welsh section renamed the Western Division, with eight clubs transferring from the English section to the Western section.

English section

A total of 20 clubs contest the division, including 17 sides from previous season and three new clubs.

Newly elected clubs:
 Torquay United (from the Western League)
 Yeovil & Petters United (from the Western League, although they continued to play in the Western League as well until World War II)
 Coventry City II (from the Birmingham & District League)

Welsh section

A total of 11 clubs contest the division, including nine sides from previous season and two new clubs.

Newly elected clubs:
 Bridgend Town
 Caerphilly

Football League election
In addition to the two clubs finishing bottom of Football League Third Division South, four non-League clubs joined the election process, of which three were from the Southern League. Boscombe from the English section were successful and joined the League the following season.

References

1922-23
1922–23 in English football leagues
1922–23 in Welsh football